The following radio stations broadcast on FM frequency 90.9 MHz:

Argentina
 BT in Rosario, Santa Fe
 Boing in Rojas, Buenos Aires
 Chascomús in Chascomús, Buenos Aires
 Extremo in Avellaneda, Buenos Aires
 La Plata in La Plata, Buenos Aires
 La Única in Puerto Madryn, Chubut
 La Uno in Villa Mercedes, San Luis
 LRL307 UB in Buenos Aires
 Radio María in Castelli, Buenos Aires
 Radio María in Arroyito, Córdoba
 Radio María in Bell Ville, Córdoba
 Signos in Carmen de Patagones, Buenos Aires
 Total in Concepción del Uruguay, Entre Ríos 
 Universidad in La Rioja
 Vida in Córdoba

Australia
 2KY in Mudgee, New South Wales
 90.9 Sea FM in Gold Coast, Queensland
 Triple J in Launceston, Tasmania
 3HCR in Omeo, Victoria

Canada (Channel 215)
 CBBX-FM in Sudbury, Ontario
 CBF-FM-13 in St-Michel-Des-Saints, Quebec
 CBJX-FM-1 in Dolbeau, Quebec
 CBRA-FM in Milk River, Alberta
 CBUX-FM in Vancouver, British Columbia
 CBWF-FM in Flin Flon, Manitoba
 CBX-FM in Edmonton, Alberta
 CBYY-FM in Kersley, British Columbia
 CBZB-FM in Boiestown, New Brunswick
 CFVZ-FM in Moose Jaw, Saskatchewan
 CHPA-FM in Port Alberni, British Columbia
 CION-FM in Quebec City, Quebec
 CJSH-FM in St. John's, Newfoundland and Labrador
 CJSW-FM in Calgary, Alberta
 VF8002 in Louiseville, Quebec

China
 CNR The Voice of China in Xiangxi
 Dong Guang Xinwen Tai in Shanghai

Japan
 YBS Radio in Kōfu, Yamanashi

Malaysia
 Nasional FM in Ipoh, Perak

Mexico
 XHAHC-FM in Chihuahua, Chihuahua
 XHANV-FM in Autlán de Navarro, Jalisco
 XHCCFD-FM in Concepción del Oro, Zacatecas
 XHCUA-FM in Campeche, Campeche
 XHCPAS-FM in Victoria de Durango, Durango
 XHCY-FM in Huejutla de Reyes, Hidalgo
 XHHS-FM in Los Mochis, Sinaloa
 XHJAP-FM in Villahermosa, Tabasco
 XHK-FM in Nuevo Laredo, Tamaulipas
 XHMPD-FM in Miahuatlán, Oaxaca
 XHMQM-FM in Mérida, Yucatán
 XHOK-FM in Monterrey, Nuevo León
 XHPSAB-FM in Sabancuy, Campeche
 XHQRT-FM in Querétaro, Querétaro
 XHRYA-FM in Reynosa, Tamaulipas
 XHTEZ-FM in Teziutlán, Puebla
 XHTPI-FM in Tampico, Tamaulipas
 XHUIA-FM in Mexico City
 XHVER-FM in Veracruz, Veracruz
 XHVLN-FM in Villagran, Tamaulipas
 XHWZ-FM in Soledad Diez Gutiérrez, San Luis Potosí
 XHYTEM-FM in Yautepec, Morelos

New Zealand
 Classic Hits FM in Gisborne and Westport
 ZM (New Zealand) in Wellington

United States (Channel 215)
  in College Station, Texas
  in Alamosa, Colorado
 KAVO (FM) in Pampa, Texas
  in Turlock, California
 KBNG-LP in Bangs, Texas
 KBSA in El Dorado, Arkansas
 KCBI in Dallas, Texas
  in Warrenton, Oregon
 KCSD (FM) in Sioux Falls, South Dakota
  in Pierpont, South Dakota
  in Dillon, Montana
 KDYR in Dyer, Nevada
 KFOI in Red Bluff, California
 KGCL in Jordan Valley, Oregon
 KGCM in Three Forks, Montana
  in Shafter, California
 KHCT (FM) in Great Bend, Kansas
  in Chualar, California
  in Lafayette, Louisiana
  in Coos Bay, Oregon
 KJHL in Boise City, Oklahoma
  in Windom, Minnesota
  in Hanalei, Hawaii
  in Lubbock, Texas
  in Willmar, Minnesota
 KKML in Minden, Louisiana
 KKRH in Grangeville, Idaho
  in Altus, Oklahoma
  in Newark, Arkansas
  in Creston, Iowa
 KLRC in Tahlequah, Oklahoma
  in Billings, Montana
 KLTP in San Angelo, Texas
 KLTQ in Thatcher, Arizona
 KLVH in Prescott, Arizona
  in Chugwater, Wyoming
  in Keokuk, Iowa
 KNFR in Gravel Ridge, Arkansas
  in Vienna, Missouri
  in Edmond, Oklahoma
 KOKT-LP in Tulsa, Oklahoma
  in Agana, Guam
 KPBG (FM) in Oroville, Washington
 KPNO in Norfolk, Nebraska
  in Coachella, California
 KRBM (FM) in Pendleton, Oregon
  in Salt Lake City, Utah
  in Cape Girardeau, Missouri
 KRJX in Rifle, Colorado
 KRLH in Hereford, Texas
 KRRT (FM) in Arroyo Seco, New Mexico
  in Rye, Colorado
  in Zuni, New Mexico
  in Farmington, New Mexico
 KSKF (FM) in Klamath Falls, Oregon
 KSLU in Hammond, Louisiana
  in West Plains, Missouri
 KSPL (FM) in Kalispell, Montana
  in Lufkin, Texas
  in Warrensburg, Missouri
 KTOL in Leadville, Colorado
 KTSU in Houston, Texas
 KTWJ in Moffit-Lincoln, North Dakota
 KUKV in Vernal, Utah
  in Cedar Falls, Iowa
  in Gillette, Wyoming
 KUWW in Fort Washakie, Wyoming
  in Pinedale, Wyoming
  in Midland, Texas
 KVNC in Minturn, Colorado
  in Paonia, Colorado
 KVTI in Tacoma, Washington
 KWRB in Bisbee, Arizona
  in Hermosa, South Dakota
 KWRK-LP in Fairbanks, Alaska
  in Sacramento, California
 KXRT in Idabel, Oklahoma
 KYFS in San Antonio, Texas
  in Kingston, New York
  in Tupelo, Mississippi
  in Crystal River, Florida
  in Laurel, Mississippi
  in Indianapolis, Indiana
 WBKC in Morgantown, Indiana
  in Marion, Indiana
  in Boston, Massachusetts
  in Albany, New York
 WCDR in Laporte, Pennsylvania
 WCFG in Springfield, Michigan
  in New London, Connecticut
  in Jamestown, New York
 WCVJ in Jefferson, Ohio
  in Williamsburg, Virginia
  in Glen Ellyn, Illinois
 WDLK in Woodlake, Virginia
  in Hazard, Kentucky
 WETA (FM) in Washington, District of Columbia
 WEVW in Elysburg, Pennsylvania
 WFAZ in Goodwater, Alabama
  in Lancaster, Ohio
 WFTF in Rutland, Vermont
  in Bryan, Ohio
 WGUC in Cincinnati, Ohio
 WGXO in Magnolia, North Carolina
 WHRM (FM) in Wausau, Wisconsin
  in Philadelphia, Pennsylvania
  in Urbana, Illinois
  in Virginia-Hibbing, Minnesota
 WJAB in Huntsville, Alabama
 WJKV in Jacksonville, Florida
  in Watertown, New York
 WJRC in Lewisburg, Pennsylvania
 WJWV in Fort Gaines, Georgia
 WKMD in Madisonville, Kentucky
 WKMP-LP in Eastman, Georgia
  in Elizabethtown, Kentucky
 WKWO in Wooster, Ohio
 WLFE in Key Largo, Florida
  in Hemingway, South Carolina
 WLNF in Rapids, New York
 WLYM-LP in Mayaguez-Anasco, Puerto Rico
  in Greenwood, Mississippi
 WMEH in Bangor, Maine
  in Gorham, Maine
  in Rose Township, Michigan
 WNBK (FM) in Whitmire, South Carolina
 WNGG in Gloversville, New York
 WNZR in Mount Vernon, Ohio
  in La Grange, Georgia
 WODB-LP in Caguas, Puerto Rico
  in Oneonta, New York
  in Brewton, Alabama
  in Schuyler Falls, New York
 WPRH in Paris, Tennessee
  in Greensboro, North Carolina
 WQLU in Lynchburg, Virginia
 WRAF (FM) in Toccoa Falls, Georgia
  in Detroit, Michigan
 WRQM in Rocky Mount, North Carolina
  in New London, New Hampshire
 WSHB in Willard, Ohio
 WSIF in Wilkesboro, North Carolina
 WSLI-FM in Belding, Michigan
  in Malone, New York
 WSOR (FM) in Naples, Florida
  in Ithaca, New York
 WSQM in Noblesville, Indiana
  in Charlevoix, Michigan
  in Freeland, Michigan
 WUPJ in Escanaba, Michigan
  in Manteo, North Carolina
 WUWS in Ashland, Wisconsin
  in Morgantown, West Virginia
 WVRI in Clifton Forge, Virginia
 WVVS-FM in Valdosta, Georgia
 WVYN in Bluford, Illinois
  in Cookeville, Tennessee
 WXAF in Charleston, West Virginia
 WYVM in Sheboygan, Wisconsin
 WZJO-LP in Columbia, South Carolina
  in Honesdale, Pennsylvania

References

Lists of radio stations by frequency